The 2007 Europe Cup in badminton was the 30th edition of the Europe Cup. It was held between June 27 and July 1, 2007, in the Juliana van Stolberghal, in Amersfoort, Netherlands. It was organized by Badminton Combination Amersfoort in cooperation with Badminton Europe and the Dutch Badminton Association.

Results

Final

References

 Europe Cup - Local Favourites Bow To Talented Russians, Badzine.net
 Badminton Europe: 2007 Europe Cup

External links
 Official website
 TournamentSoftware: Europe Cup 2007

Europe Cup (badminton)
Europe Cup
Europe Cup (badminton)
Badminton tournaments in the Netherlands
International sports competitions hosted by the Netherlands
Europe Cup (badminton)